Linda Armstrong is an English actress, known for her role as Sister Brigid in The Royal.

Career 
Armstrong played Sister Brigid in ITV's The Royal throughout the series. Her television debut  was in an episode of Peak Practice. She has since played guest roles and semi-regular roles in various television series, including A Touch of Frost (ITV Series); Bugs (BBC Series); Dangerfield (BBC series); Casualty (BBC); The Bill (ITV); Brookside (Channel 4) and Doctors (BBC). In 2020, she portrayed the role of DI Dent in the ITV soap opera Emmerdale.

Filmography

Film

Television

References

External links 
 

Alumni of RADA
English television actresses
English people of Irish descent
Actresses from London
Living people
Year of birth missing (living people)
Place of birth missing (living people)
Actresses from Nottinghamshire
Actors from Nottingham
English stage actresses
20th-century English actresses
21st-century English actresses